Walter Wright LL.D. was an English academic administrator at the University of Oxford.

Wright was a Doctor of Law. He served as Vice-Chancellor of Oxford University from 1547 until 1550.

Wright was also Archdeacon of Oxford nfrom 1543 until his death in 1561.

References

Year of birth missing
Year of death missing
Vice-Chancellors of the University of Oxford
16th-century scholars
16th-century English educators
Archdeacons of Oxford